Delia is a feminine given name, either taken from an epithet of the Greek moon goddess Artemis, or else representing a short form of Adelia, Bedelia, Cordelia or Odelia.

Meanings and origins
According to records for the 1901 Irish census, there were 6,260 persons named Delia living that year in all 32 counties of Ireland, with 256 more bearing the full forename Bedelia (plus 59 other persons with the variant spelling Bidelia, and 361 Biddy, 529 Bride and 153984 Bridget). These related names originated as English renderings of the Irish name Brighid (or Bríd) meaning "exalted one", which originally belonged to a pagan fertility goddess (later, to an important medieval saint).

In most cases, however, the name Delia refers to the tiny Greek island of Delos, the birthplace of Artemis and her twin brother Apollo.

People
 Delia Akeley (1869–1970), American explorer
 Delia Arnold (born 1986), Malaysian professional squash player
 Delia Bacon (1811–1859), American author and Shakespearean scholar
 Delia Boccardo (born 1948), Italian actress
 Didi Contractor (1929–2021, née Delia Kinzinger), German-American architect
 Delia Derbyshire (1937–2001), British musician and composer of electronic music
 Delia Ephron (born 1944), American author, screenwriter and playwright
 Delia Fiallo (1924–2021), Cuban romance novelist and screenwriter
 Delia Garcés (1919–2001), Argentine film actress 
 Delia Gonzalez (born 1970), American boxer
 Delia Green (1886–1900), teenage African-American murder victim, reported inspiration for several traditional blues songs
 Delia Grigore (born 1972), Romanian Romani writer, philologist, academic and Romani rights activist
Delia Knox (born 1962), Pastor, Gospel singer/recording artist
 Delia Opekokew, Cree lawyer and writer
 Delia Lawrie (born 1966), Australian politician
 Delia Matache (born 1982), Romanian pop singer
 Delia Mathews (born 1990), New Zealand-born ballet dancer
 Delia Mayer (born 1967), Swiss actress and singer
 Deliana Delia Meulenkamp (1933–2013), also known by her married name Delia Dooling, Dutch-born American swimmer
 Delia Parodi (1913–1991), Argentine politician
 Delia Scala (1929–2004), Italian ballerina and actress
 Cordelia Delia Sherman (born 1951), American fantasy writer and editor
 Delia Smith (born 1941), English celebrity chef and cookery writer
 Delia Vaudan, Italian luger who competed from the late 1970s to the early 1990s
 Delia Villegas Vorhauer (1940–1992), American, Latina social worker
 Delia Webster (1817–1904), American teacher, author, businesswoman and abolitionist

Fictional characters
 Delia Brown, on the American TV show Everwood (2002–2006; played by Vivien Cardone)
 Delia Banks, on the TV show Ghost Whisperer (2005–2010; played by Camryn Manheim)
 Delia Busby, from the television show Call the Midwife
 Delia Cahel, from the William Butler Yeats play Cathleen ni Houlihan
 Delia Deetz, from the 1988 movie Beetlejuice, played by Catherine O'Hara
 Delia Delfano, from the Disney Channel sitcom I Didn't Do It.
 Delia Ketchum from Pokémon, the mother of Ash Ketchum
 Delia Dantes, in Tui T. Sutherland and Kari Sutherland's Menagerie book trilogy
 Delia York, in the made-for-TV movie Omen IV: The Awakening (1991; played by Asia Vieira)
 Delia Jones, the main character in Zora Neal Hurston's short story Sweat
 Delia, a player character in the Korean MMO Vindictus.
 Delia DeLions, protagonist in Grateful Dead song "Stagger Lee"
 Delia Abott, on the TV Soap Opera The Young & The Restless
 Delia, the romantic interest of the Roman love poet Tibullus's first book.

References

English feminine given names
Spanish feminine given names
Romanian feminine given names
Epithets of Artemis
Hypocorisms